East 105th–Quincy is a station on the RTA Red Line in Cleveland, Ohio. It is located in the Fairfax neighborhood, on the city's east side. The station has a small entrance on the north side of Quincy Avenue.

History
The station opened on March 15, 1955 as one of the original stations on the CTS Rapid Transit. The original station, which had an entrance on the east side of East 105th Street, lasted almost 50 years.

On January 11, 2005, RTA broke ground for a reconstruction of the station. The station was relocated just west of the original station at East 105th and includes an entrance on Quincy Avenue. The new $1.3 million station opened on November 4, 2005.

Until a 2017-2018 renovation project, the platform at the station was substantially shorter than platforms at other stations on The Red Line as well as shorter than the train itself. Therefore, selective door operation was used; only the first door in the first car adjacent to the operator cab opened while at the platform, requiring detraining passengers to walk to the front of the first car to disembark while passengers who are boarding could only do so though the same one door.

From 2017 to 2019, a renovation project was undertaken to add a second entrance on East 105th Street, which had been planned for after a new bridge was built on East 105th Street. The project resulted in extending the platform to fit the full length of a three-car train. The East 105th entrance opened on April 5, 2019. Station renovations with the reconstruction of the Quincy entrance were completed on June 15, 2019.

Station signage referred to the station as Quincy–East 105th until renovations and expansion were completed.

Station layout

Notable places nearby
 Karamu House

References

External links

Red Line (RTA Rapid Transit)
Railway stations in the United States opened in 1955
Fairfax, Cleveland
1955 establishments in Ohio